Florida Tech refers to the Florida Institute of Technology in Melbourne, Florida. In the past it has also referred to

Florida Technical College
University of Central Florida, formerly called Florida Technological University

Florida Tech does not refer to Florida Polytechnic University (FPU or Florida Polytech). FPU refers to a new university created in 2012 in Florida.
Florida Polytechnic University